is a 1986 Japanese animated science fiction film based on the novel by Taku Mayumura. Produced by Madhouse Studios and directed and co-written by Mori Masaki, the film was released in Japan on December 20, 1986, on Kadokawa Shoten and Toho. The character designs were by Moto Hagio.

The film was adapted into a Family Computer game by Kemco and was released on December 26, 1986.

References

External links

Official Madhouse Toki no Tabibito -Time Stranger- film website 

1986 anime films
Adventure anime and manga
Animated films about time travel
Comedy anime and manga
Japanese animated films
Madhouse (company)
Science fiction anime and manga